Events from the year 1752 in Canada.

Incumbents
French Monarch: Louis XV
British and Irish Monarch: George II

Governors
Governor General of New France: Jacques-Pierre de Taffanel de la Jonquière, Marquis de la Jonquière then Michel-Ange Duquesne de Menneville
Colonial Governor of Louisiana: Pierre de Rigaud, Marquis de Vaudreuil-Cavagnial
Governor of Nova Scotia: Edward Cornwallis
Commodore-Governor of Newfoundland: Francis William Drake

Events
 23 March – Canada's first newspaper, the weekly Halifax Gazette, is published
 French kill Miami chief, fortify the Ohio Valley region with forts from Lake Erie to the forks of the Ohio River
  La Corne began a three-year appointment as the western commander of the poste de l'Ouest
 The British Empire adopts the Gregorian calendar.

Births
 25 February – John Graves Simcoe, first lieutenant governor of Upper Canada (d.1806)

Deaths 
 Jacques-Pierre de Taffanel de la Jonquière, Marquis de la Jonquière, governor general of New France, on 17 March (born 1685)

Historical documents
British law mandates switch from Julian to Gregorian calendar, so that 2 September 1752 is followed next day by 14 September

French fort at Crown Point, being "very obnoxious to His Majesty's plantations," must be demolished for security of British colonies

British ambassador insists French government demolish Niagara River fort and that Governor General De la Jonquière be ordered to desist

Agent of Massachusetts government learns in Montreal that its western trade involves hundreds of canoes and more than 1,000 men

Survey of coast near Louisbourg shows where British forces might land and take unprotected road to fortress (Note: "savages" use)

Earlier peace treaty renewed with Miꞌkmaq at Halifax, with hunting and fishing rights, semi-annual food provision and annual presents

Essay on regaining loyalty of Six Nations includes suggestion that superintendent oversee both relations and currently exploitative trade

New Nova Scotia governor echoes Cornwallis opinion that Chignecto Acadians are useful, necessary and impossible to replace

Advertisement for sale of six enslaved people (four teens and two adults) in Halifax

Appointed Halifax fire wardens to direct fire suppression, and anyone robbing houses in or near fire to be punished with death

Estates of Nova Scotia debtors in jail who are "wholly depending upon the Charity of Compassionate Persons" may be tapped for creditors and jailer

Map: Fictitious Northwest Passage that mapmaker Joseph-Nicolas Delisle based on fictitious 1640 voyage of Spanish admiral

References

 
Canada
52